OBB Media is an American multimedia production company and studio founded in 2016 by entrepreneur, director/producer Michael D. Ratner. OBB Media is the parent company to OBB Pictures, OBB Sound, OBB Branded, and OBB Cares. The company is best known for producing film, television, podcasts, and branded content and has amassed an audience of over 2 billion. Since its inception, OBB has carved out a stronghold in the new media space creating award-winning content.

The company headquarters is located in West Hollywood, California, with post-production facilities nearby in Hollywood, California.

History
Founded in 2016 by Michael D. Ratner, OBB Media is the parent company to OBB Pictures, OBB Sound, OBB Branded, OBB Cares, and OBB Pictures. The multimedia production company and studio specialize in TV, digital, film, podcasts, branded content, and social good, and has amassed an audience of over 2 billion.

OBB Pictures 
OBB Pictures is the film and television division of the parent company OBB Media. In May 2016, OBB Pictures produced Gonzo @ the Derby for ESPN's 30 for 30 series, which followed Hunter S. Thompson's trip to the Kentucky Derby and is directed by Michael D. Ratner and narrated by Sean Penn. In February 2018, OBB Pictures released Cold As Balls in conjunction with Laugh Out Loud Network. The series stars Kevin Hart as he interviews different athletes and celebrities while both interviewer and interviewee are sitting in cold tubs. In 2019, OBB produced Netflix's Historical Roasts, an American comedy television series based on the Los Angeles live comedy show of the same name. In 2019, OBB Pictures produced The Harder Way for ESPN+, with LeBron James serving as executive producer.

In early 2020, OBB premiered a docu-series titled: Justin Bieber: Seasons, which sold for more than $20M. The series received more than 32 million views on its first week and it is the company's highest rated premiere in their history. OBB produced the music video for Justin Bieber's Intentions featuring Quavo which was directed by Michael D. Ratner. In October 2020, OBB Pictures released Justin Bieber: Next Chapter, a documentary follow-up to the hit 10-episode docuseries, Justin Bieber: Seasons.

In June 2020, OBB announced it will spearhead a four-part documentary series on YouTube called Demi Lovato: Dancing with the Devil, following pop star Demi Lovato; the series was released on March 23, 2021. Earlier that year, it was announced that Demi Lovato: Dancing with the Devil was selected as the Opening Night Headliner of SXSW and would have its World Premiere at the film festival. The film explores every aspect that led to Lovato's nearly fatal overdose in 2018 and her awakenings in the aftermath.

In 2021, OBB Pictures partnered with Hailey Bieber to launch her YouTube Channel. Bieber and OBB will create a slate of short-form videos, including the hit series, Who's in my Bathroom. The channel reached a million subscribers within the first six weeks of launch.

In late 2021, Cold as Balls with Kevin Hart dropped season five and garnered over 10 million views. OBB Pictures released Inside the Lockdown Sessions with Elton John and Adele: The 30 Interview on Apple Music.

As of 2022, OBB Pictures released The Game Plan with Shaquille O'Neal in February 2022. The TNT TV series showcases the NBA legend working with entrepreneurs to help identify new opportunities for their business. In late 2022, OBB Pictures and LOL Network will release, Storytown, an adult animated hip-hop comedy on HBO Max.

OBB Sound 

In 2020, OBB Sound announced the launch of a podcast series featuring Blake Griffin titled The Pursuit of Healthiness, seasons 2 and 3 of Ashley Graham's "Pretty Big Deal" podcast. In October 2020, OBB Sound released Country Shine with Graham Bunn, a country music podcast with new episodes twice a week on Spotify. Billed as "the ultimate destination for fans of country music," the series is hosted by Bunn and co-hosted with sports reporter Camryn Irwin.

In January 2021, OBB Sound and Rolling Stone released a new original podcast Too Long; Didn't Watch. OBB Sound partnered with Audible to produce original audio series. Also announced was the forthcoming scripted 10-part possession horror series The Glowing, for Audible, which is entering production in 2021. In March 2021, it was announced that OBB Sound would be partnering with Cadence 13 and Demi Lovato on a new podcast, 4D with Demi Lovato. The weekly podcast series features Lovato conversing with special guests about identity, creativity, activism, philanthropy, and beyond.

In late 2021, OBB Sound began producing IN GOOD FAITH, a podcast series hosted by Churchome founders Chelsea and Judah Smith.

OBB Sound has numerous audio and podcast series in development, including season two of Too Long, Didn't Watch and Kym, co-produced by Lena Waithe. The podcast is an original comedy series inspired by the life of actor-comedian Kym Whitley as she navigates single motherhood and Hollywood.

OBB Branded 
OBB Branded is the Clio Award-winning branded content and corporate partnerships division of parent company OBB Media. The group has created content for brands such as 818 Tequila, Airbnb, Glenlivet, Lexus, LG, Michelin, Old Spice, Red Bull, and Tinder.

OBB Branded created and produced the series Inside Kylie Cosmetics. The series is about Kylie Jenner and running her cosmetics brand, Kylie Cosmetics.

OBB Cares 
OBB Cares is the philanthropic division of parent company OBB Media.

As a result of the video, Alexandria House has seen an 800% increase in web traffic, donations from around the world, and increased exposure. Following the release of the Intentions music video, OBB and the clothing label Girl Gang partnered to create a capsule collection to raise funds for Alexandria House.

Awards

References

American companies established in 2016
Mass media companies established in 2016
Companies based in West Hollywood, California
2016 establishments in California